The House von der Osten-Sacken is an old and distinguished noble family of Baltic Germans. The family members held the titles of Baron, Graf, Knyaz and Fürst.

History 
The origins of the family are traced to 14th century. In 16th and 17th centuries the family members held higher positions in Courland. Many of them entered the service of Polish–Lithuanian Commonwealth, Sweden, Saxony, Prussia, the Dutch Republic, and, since the second half of the 18th century, the Russian Empire.

Notable members 

Carl Robert von der Osten-Sacken (1828–1906) Russian diplomat and entomologist 
Fabian Gottlieb von der Osten-Sacken (1752–1837), Russian field marshal
Dmitri von der Osten-Sacken (1789–1881), Russian general

References

German-language surnames
Russian noble families
People from Courland
Baltic nobility
Compound surnames